The 2011 Hialeah mayoral election was held on Tuesday, November 1, 2011, in Hialeah, Florida. Acting Mayor Carlos Hernandez, who became mayor in 2011 when his predecessor, Julio Robaina, left office in May 2011 to pursue an unsuccessful bid for Mayor of Miami-Dade County, sought a full term. Four candidates contested the election. The election was officially nonpartisan.

Candidates
Carlos Hernandez - Acting, incumbent Mayor since May 23, 2011. (Republican Party)
Rudy Garcia - Former Florida State Senator (Republican Party)
Raul L. Martinez - Former Mayor of Hialeah from 1981 to 2005 (Democratic Party)
George 'Yoyito' Castro - Political newcomer (Independent)

Endorsements
The Miami Herald endorsed former Florida State Senator Rudy Garcia in the 2011 mayoral election.

General election

Runoff election
The mayoral runoff election was held on November 15, 2011 between incumbent Mayor Carlos Hernandez and former Mayor Raul L. Martinez.

See also
 List of mayors of Hialeah, Florida

References

History of Hialeah, Florida
2011 Florida elections
Hialeah
Mayoral elections in Hialeah, Florida